Mar Hicks is a historian of technology, gender and modern Europe, notable for their work on the history of women in computing. Hicks is a professor at the Illinois Institute of Technology. Hicks wrote the 2017 book, Programmed Inequality: How Britain Discarded Women Technologists and Lost Its Edge in Computing.

Early life and education

Hicks received a B.A. in Modern European History from Harvard University with their thesis The Price of Excellence: Coresidence and Women's Integration at Oxford and Harvard Universities, 1964-1977. They studied history at University of Oxford for a year as a visiting student. After receiving a M.A. from the Department of History at Duke University, Hicks earned a Ph.D., also from the Department of History at Duke University.

Career
Prior to earning a Ph.D., Hicks worked at Harvard University as a UNIX System Administrator. Hicks has said the position informed their later work on history of technology.

Hicks is currently an associate professor with tenure at Illinois Institute of Technology. Hicks was previously a visiting assistant professor at North Carolina State University in Raleigh, North Carolina, a visiting assistant professor at Duke University, in Durham, North Carolina, an assistant professor at the Illinois Institute of Technology in Chicago, and an assistant professor of history of technology at the University of Wisconsin–Madison until the closure of that university’s history of science department.

Hicks's work focuses on issues of inequality in high tech, particularly gender discrimination in the computing industry. Their book "Programmed Inequality: How Britain Discarded Women Technologists and Lost Its Edge In Computing" reveals a switch in the 1960s and 1970s, where as computing roles became more powerful, women who dominated computer programming roles were systematically replaced with men.

Hicks is known for drawing from this history when writing about contemporary gender issues in the computing industry. Hicks has also written about the early history of computer dating in the mainframe era, showing that women were at the forefront of creating computer dating businesses, contrary to what was previously thought.

Hicks is an Associate Editor of the IEEE Annals of the History of Computing.

Hicks is non-binary and uses they/them pronouns.

Selected membership
 Society for the History of Technology, Executive Committee

Selected awards
2019 IEEE Computer Society Best Paper Award for "Hacking the Cis-Tem: Transgender Citizens and the Early Digital State” 
 2018-2019: National Humanities Center, Triangle Park, North Carolina, Fellow
 2019: American Historical Association, Herbert Baxter Adams Prize in European History for Programmed Inequality
 2018: Society for the History of Technology, Hacker Prize for Programmed Inequality
 2018: North American Conference on British Studies, Stansky Prize for Programmed Inequality
 2018: Association of American Publishers, PROSE Award for Programmed Inequality
 2017: British Business Archives Council, Wadsworth Prize for Programmed Inequality

Selected works and publications

Works

Selected publications

References

External links 
 
 
 Mar Hicks at Illinois Institute of Technology

Living people
Duke University alumni
Harvard University alumni
University of Wisconsin–Madison faculty
21st-century American historians
Historians of Europe
Year of birth missing (living people)
Non-binary writers